Capital Univ. of Economics & Business station is an interchange station on Line 10 and Fangshan Line of the Beijing Subway in Beijing.  The station opened on December 30, 2012, and is named after the Fengtai campus of the Capital University of Economics and Business.

Station Layout 
The line 10 and Fangshan line stations have underground island platforms.

Exits 
There are 5 exits, lettered B, C, D, E, and F.. Exits B and D are accessible.

Gallery

References

Railway stations in China opened in 2012
Beijing Subway stations in Fengtai District